Schell is a surname. Notable people with the surname include:
 Albert and Charles Schell, founders of Schell Leather Company
 Baron Boris Fitinhof-Schell (1829–1901), Russian composer
 Brad Schell (born 1984), Canadian ice hockey player
 Daniel Schell (born 1980), Australian rules footballer
 Desiree Schell, Canadian skeptic
 Catherine Schell (born 1944), actress
 Gaea Schell
 Harry Schell
 Jacob Thomas Schell
 Jesse Schell
 Jonathan Schell
 Jordu Schell
 Jozef Schell
 Judit Schell
 Maria Schell
 Maximilian Schell
 Mort Schell (born 1943), Australian politician
 Orville Schell
 Paul Schell
 Roger R. Schell
 Ronnie Schell
 Richardson W. Schell (born 1951), School Headmaster

See also
 August Schell Brewing Company
 North Schell Peak
 Schell City, Missouri
 Schell Creek Range
 
 
 Shell (disambiguation)